Joona Tapio Puhakka (born June 23, 1982 in Kerava) is a diver from Finland, who competed in three consecutive Summer Olympics for his native country - Sydney 2000, Athens 2004, and Beijing in 2008.  He won the bronze medal in the men's 1-meter springboard at the 2003 World Championships in Barcelona, Spain.  While competing for Arizona State University in Tempe, Arizona, he won four NCAA (National Collegiate Athletic Association) championships - two on the 1-meter springboard, and two on the 3-meter springboard. Joona attended Arizona State from August 2002 until his graduation in May 2006.       

Puhakka changed over from swimming to diving.

References
 Profile

1982 births
Living people
People from Kerava
Finnish male divers
Divers at the 2000 Summer Olympics
Divers at the 2004 Summer Olympics
Divers at the 2008 Summer Olympics
Olympic divers of Finland
Divers from Helsinki
World Aquatics Championships medalists in diving